George W. Cross (born September 30, 1872) was an American politician from Cape Girardeau County, Missouri, who served in the Missouri House of Representatives.  He married Vina B. Phelan of Memphis, Tennessee, in the city of Osceola, Arkansas.  He worked as a manufacturer and also for the Cape Girardeau Northern Railway.

References

1872 births
Republican Party members of the Missouri House of Representatives
People from Cape Girardeau, Missouri
Year of death missing
People from Pulaski, New York